Gaspar Griswold Bacon, Sr. (March 7, 1886 – December 25, 1947) served on the board of overseers of Harvard University, as the President of the Massachusetts Senate from 1929 to 1932 and as the 51st lieutenant governor of Massachusetts from 1933 to 1935.

Biography
Bacon was born in Jamaica Plain, Boston, on March 7, 1886, to Robert Bacon. Bacon had a brother, Robert L. Bacon.

Bacon received his undergraduate degree from Harvard College in 1908; he then went on to earn his law degree from Harvard Law School in 1912.

In 1912, Bacon actively campaigned for Theodore Roosevelt and the Progressive Party. He was involved in the founding of the Military School at Harvard College in 1919. He was also a lecturer on the staff of Boston University in the late 1920s.

In 1920, he was a supporter of Leonard Wood's campaign for the Republican nomination for president and was a delegate to the Republican National Convention that year.  Bacon served in the Massachusetts State Senate in from 1925 to 1932.  From 1933 to 1934, he was Lieutenant Governor of Massachusetts.

In 1934, Bacon was the Republican nominee for Massachusetts Governor. An opponent of Franklin Roosevelt's New Deal, Bacon was defeated by Boston Mayor James Michael Curley.

Bacon was in American forces sent to Mexico under General Pershing in 1916. Bacon was in the Field Artillery Officers' Reserve Corps, where he served as a captain and major during World War I.

During World War II, Bacon was a lieutenant colonel on General George Patton's staff, where he served for three years and ten months, in the G5, as the chief of the Government Affairs Branch.

Bacon died on Christmas Day, December 25, 1947, in Dedham, Massachusetts. His funeral was held at St. Paul's Protestant Episcopal Church. He was buried in Walnut Hills Cemetery 
in Brookline, Massachusetts.

Awards 
Croix de Guerre
Legion of Honor

Family life
Bacon married Priscilla Toland on July 16, 1910, in St. Thomas' Church in Whitemarsh, Pennsylvania. Bacon and his wife were the parents of three sons. One of Bacon's sons was the actor Gaspar G. Bacon, Jr., better known as David Bacon.

See also
 1925–1926 Massachusetts legislature
 1927–1928 Massachusetts legislature
 1929–1930 Massachusetts legislature
 1931–1932 Massachusetts legislature

Publications 
Bacon, Gaspar G. The Constitution of the United States in Some of Its Fundamental Aspects. Cambridge, Massachusetts: Harvard University Press, 1928. 
Bacon, Gaspar G. The Founding of the Town of Barnstable, Commonwealth of Massachusetts: 1639–1939, Tercentenary Address. Barnstable, MA: [publisher not identified], 1939. 
Bacon, Gaspar G. Political Parties in the United States: Empty Bottles or Flowing Streams. Boston, Mass. : [publisher not identified], 1940. 
Bacon, Gaspar G., and Wendell Dearborn Howie. One by One. Cambridge, Massachusetts: [Harvard University Print. Office], 1943.

References

1886 births
1947 deaths
Harvard Law School alumni
Massachusetts lawyers
Lieutenant Governors of Massachusetts
Republican Party Massachusetts state senators
Presidents of the Massachusetts Senate
Boston University faculty
Massachusetts Progressives (1912)
United States Army personnel of World War II
Lawyers from Boston
United States Army personnel of World War I
Harvard College alumni
People from Jamaica Plain